Joshua Nelson may refer to:

 Joshua Nelson (singer), American gospel singer and Hebrew teacher
 Joshua Nelson (politician) (born 1987), member of the West Virginia House of Delegates

See also
 Josh Nelson (born 1978), American jazz pianist and composer